The Third Federal Electoral District of the Federal District (III Distrito Electoral Federal del Distrito Federal) is one of the 300 Electoral Districts into which Mexico is divided for the purpose of elections to the federal Chamber of Deputies and one of 27 such districts in the Federal District ("DF" or Mexico City).

It elects one deputy to the lower house of Congress for each three-year legislative period, by means of the first past the post system.

District territory
Under the 2005 districting scheme, the DF's Third District covers the central and western portion of the borough (delegación) of Azcapotzalco.

Previous districting schemes

1996–2005 district
Between 1996 and 2005, the Third District covered the central portion of Azcapotzalco only.

Deputies returned to Congress from this district

XLII Legislature
 1952–1955: Felipe Gómez Mont (PAN)
XLIII Legislature
 1955–1958: Patricio Aguirre Andrade (PAN)
XLIV Legislature
 1958–1961: Felipe Gómez Mont (PAN)
XLV Legislature
 1955–1958: Javier Blanco Sánchez (PAN)
L Legislature
 1976–1979: Carlos Riva Palacio (PRI)
LI Legislature
 1979–1982: Hugo Domenzáin Guzmán (PRI)
LII Legislature
 1982–1985: Carlos Jiménez Macías (PRI)
LIII Legislature
 1985–1988:
LIV Legislature
 1988–1991: Juan Francisco Díaz Aguirre (PRI)
LV Legislature
 1991–1994:
LVI Legislature
 1994–1997: Rogelio Zamora Barradas (PRI)
LVII Legislature
 1997–2000: Antonio Palomino Rivera (PRD)
LVIII Legislature
 2000–2003: José Pablo Arévalo González (PVEM)
LIX Legislature
 2003–2006: Pablo Franco Hernández (PRD)
LX Legislature
 2006–2009: Ramón Pacheco Llanes (PRD)

References and notes

Federal electoral districts of Mexico
Mexico City